Multiple British vessels have been named King George for one of the members of the British monarchs:

  was launched in France. From 1787 on she made three voyages as a Bristol-based slave ship. She was lost at Barbados in 1791 on her fourth voyage with the loss of 280 of the 360 slaves on board.
  was launched on the Thames. She spent about three-quarters of her career sailing for the Hudson's Bay Company (HBC), and then the last quarter of her career as a whaler in the British northern whale fishery. She foundered there without a trace in 1822. 
 , of 346 tons burthen, was built on the Thames. From 1817 she made three voyages to the British Southern Whale Fishery, and was condemned at Guayaquil in 1824 on her fourth.
  made six voyages for the British East India Company (EIC) between 1785 and 1798. She also participated in the invasion of St Lucia. In 1798 her owners sold her and she became a West Indiaman. An accident in 1800 at Jamaica destroyed her.
  was a British merchant ship engaged in whaling and the maritime fur trade in the late 18th century. She was launched in 1785 and taken up by the King George's Sound Company. She sailed in 1785 on a voyage of exploration, together with the Queen Charlotte. The two vessels whaled in the South Seas and sought furs in the Pacific Northwest. They returned to England via Canton, where they picked up cargoes for the British East India Company (EIC). Their voyage accomplished a circumnavigation of the world. On her return new owners apparently sailed her between Britain and South Carolina. She is no longer listed after 1796.
  was launched in France in 1775 under another name, possibly as Enterprize. She became a Bristol-based slave ship. Under the name Sally she made three slave-trading voyages between 1783 and 1786. Then from 1787 on as King George she made three more complete slave-trading voyages. She was lost at Barbados in 1791 on her seventh voyage with the loss of 280 of the 360 slaves on board.
  was a French ship that the British captured circa 1797. Her new owners renamed her and employed her as a Liverpool-based slave ship. She made three complete voyages carrying slaves from Africa to the West Indies and was lost on her fourth voyage in February 1803 as she was returning to Liverpool after having delivered slaves to Havana.
  was captured by the French privateer Représailles in 1803 and became the French privateer Brave.
 King George was built by Kable & Underwood at Sydney in 1805.

See also

Hired armed cutter King George

Ship names